Ludvig "Ludde" Erik Håkanson (born March 22, 1996) is a Swedish professional basketball player for Bilbao Basket of the Liga ACB. Standing at 1.93 m (6 ft 4 in) he plays at the point guard and shooting guard positions.

Professional career
A product of Alvik Basket, Håkanson left his native Sweden in 2011 to join the youth set-up of FC Barcelona. He secured himself a spot on Barca's farm team, FC Barcelona B, for the 2012–13 season. He then played with the senior men's team of FC Barcelona in the 2014–15 season.

In the 2015–2016 season, he played on loan for VEF Rīga and Baloncesto Sevilla. He was an early entry candidate for the 2016 NBA draft, but then removed his name from the list.

In August 2016, he was sent to Baloncesto Fuenlabrada of the Spanish top-flight ACB on a two-year loan deal, with FC Barcelona having the option to return him at the end of the 2016–17 season.

On July 31, 2017, Håkanson parted ways with FC Barcelona. On August 11, 2017, he signed a three-year deal with Movistar Estudiantes.

On September 13, 2019, he has signed with Stelmet Zielona Góra of the PLK. 

On July 13, 2020, he has signed with RETAbet Bilbao Basket of the Liga ACB.

Swedish national team
Håkanson was a part of the senior men's Swedish national basketball team that competed at the EuroBasket 2013.

References

External links
FIBA profile
FIBA Europe profile
Euroleague.net profile
Eurobasket.com profile
ACB.com profile 
NBADraft.com profile
Draftexpress.com profile
Twitter Account

1996 births
Living people
Baloncesto Fuenlabrada players
Basket Zielona Góra players
Bilbao Basket players
BK VEF Rīga players
Real Betis Baloncesto players
FC Barcelona Bàsquet players
Liga ACB players
Point guards
Shooting guards
Swedish expatriate basketball people in Latvia
Swedish expatriate basketball people in Poland
Swedish expatriate basketball people in Spain
Swedish men's basketball players
Sportspeople from Stockholm